Sven Daleflod (born Eriksson, 5 September 1919 – April 2009) was a Swedish javelin thrower who won four consecutive Swedish titles in 1942-45. He competed at the 1946 European Championships and placed fifth. He qualified for the 1948 Olympics, but had to withdraw due to a chickenpox infection.

References

Swedish male javelin throwers
1919 births
2009 deaths